Greg James Thompson (born 17 September 1987) is an Irish cricketer. He is a right-handed batsman and a leg-break bowler. He has played for Ireland since 2004, playing for the full squad before reverting to play for the Under-17, Under-19 and Under-23 teams respectively from 2005 onwards. He played for Lancashire during 2005, having played for Hampshire's Second XI in 2004. He represented Lancashire in the Second XI trophy during 2006.

Thompson represented Ireland in the 2004 and 2006 Under-19 World Cups. He made his One Day International (ODI) debut against Bangladesh on 18 March 2008, and went on to play in all three matches of this tour (his only ODI appearances to date). He made his Twenty20 International (T20I) debut against Hong Kong more than 8 years later on 5 September 2016.

He is the joint leading wicket-taker along with Moisés Henriques in Under-19 Cricket World Cup tournament history with 27 dismissals.

In July 2019, he was selected to play for the Belfast Titans in the inaugural edition of the Euro T20 Slam cricket tournament. However, the following month the tournament was cancelled.

References

External links 
 
 

1987 births
Ireland One Day International cricketers
Ireland Twenty20 International cricketers
Irish cricketers
Living people
Sportspeople from Lisburn
Durham MCCU cricketers
Lancashire cricketers
Alumni of Durham University
Northern Knights cricketers
Cricketers from Northern Ireland